Panagiotis Petras (born 14 November 1983) is a Greek former professional footballer who played as a midfielder.

References

1983 births
Living people
OFI Crete F.C. players
A.O. Kerkyra players
Ethnikos Piraeus F.C. players
Niki Volos F.C. players
Super League Greece players
Association football midfielders
Footballers from Heraklion
Greek footballers